Leela Roy  (2 October 1900 – 11 June 1970), was a radical leftist Indian woman politician and reformer, and a close associate of Netaji Subhash Chandra Bose. She was born in Goalpara, Assam to Girish Chandra Naag, who was a deputy magistrate, and her mother was Kunjalata Naag. She was the first female student of Dhaka University.

Family
She was born into an upper middle class Kayastha family in Sylhet in Bengal (now in Bangladesh) and educated at the Bethune College in Calcutta, graduating with a gold medal in English. Her father was Girischandra Nag. He was the tutor of Subhas Chandra Bose. She fought with university authorities and became the first woman to be admitted to the University of Dhaka and earned her M.A. degree. Co-education was not permitted in Dhaka University. The then Vice Chancellor Philip Hartog gave a special permission for her admission.

Social work

She threw herself into social work and education for girls, starting the second girls school in Dhaka. She encouraged girls learning skills and receiving vocational training and emphasized the need for girls to learn martial arts to defend themselves. Over the years, she set up a number of schools and institutes for women.

She contacted Netaji Subhas Chandra Bose when he was leading the relief action after the 1921 Bengal floods. Leela Nag, then a student of the Dhaka University, was instrumental in forming the Dhaka Women's Committee and, in that capacity, raised donations and relief goods to help Netaji.

In 1931, she began publishing Jayasree, the first magazine edited, managed, and wholly contributed by women writers. It received the blessings of many eminent personalities including Rabindranath Tagore, who suggested its name.

Political activity
Leela Nag formed a rebellion organization in December 1923 called Deepali Sangha (Dipali Sangha) in Dhaka where combat training were given. Pritilata Waddedar took courses from there. She took part in the Civil Disobedience Movement and was imprisoned for six years. In 1938, she was nominated by Congress President, Subhas Chandra Bose to the National Planning Committee of the Congress. In 1939 she married Anil Chandra Roy. On Bose's resignation from the Congress, the couple joined him in the Forward Bloc.

In 1941, when there was a serious outburst of communal rioting in Dhaka, she along with Sarat Chandra Bose formed the Unity Board and National Service Brigade. In 1942, during the Quit India Movement both she and her husband were arrested and her magazine was forced to cease. On her release in 1946, she was elected to the Constituent Assembly of India.

During the partition violence, she met Gandhi in Noakhali. Even before Gandhiji reached there, she opened a relief center and rescued 400 women after touring on foot 90 miles in just six days. After the Partition of India, she ran homes in Calcutta for destitute and abandoned women and tried to help refugees from East Bengal. From 1946 to 1947, Roy set up seventeen relief camps in Noakhali, following the riots which took place there - activist Suhasini Das worked at one.

In 1947 she founded the Jatiya Mahila Sanghati, a women's organisation in West Bengal.

Later years 
In 1960 she became the chairwoman of the new party formed with the merger of the Forward Bloc (Subhasist) and the Praja Socialist Party but was disappointed with its working. After two years she retired from active politics.

Leela Roy's letters were recovered from the items of an ascetic named Bhagwanji, who died in Faizabad in 1985. The letters reveal, that Leela Roy came in touch with Bhagwanji in 1962, at Neemsar, Uttar Pradesh. She stayed in touch with him till her death in 1970, and kept providing for him.

She died in June 1970, after a prolonged illness.

Homage paid 
On December 22, 2008, The Vice President, Shri. Mohammad Hamid Ansari, the Speaker, Lok Sabha, Shri Somnath Chatterjee, the Prime Minister, Dr. Manmohan Singh and the Leader of Opposition in Lok Sabha, Shri L. K. Advani were present during unveiling of Leela Roy's portrait in Central Hall of Indian parliament.

See also
 Pritilata Waddedar

References

Indian independence activists from Assam
People from Sylhet
1900 births
1970 deaths
Bethune College alumni
University of Calcutta alumni
University of Dhaka alumni
All India Forward Bloc politicians
Members of the Constituent Assembly of India
Women Indian independence activists
Social workers
20th-century Indian educational theorists
20th-century Indian women
Women educators from Assam
Educators from Assam
20th-century Indian women politicians
20th-century Indian politicians
Indian social reformers
Activists from Assam
Scholars from Assam
Women in Assam politics
Social workers from Assam
20th-century women educators
Hindu feminists
Bengali Hindus
Female revolutionaries
Indian independence activists from West Bengal